Cyperus subcaracasanus is a species of sedge that is endemic to Navassa Island, which lies off the coast of Haiti.

The species was first formally described by the botanist Georg Kükenthal in 1929.

See also
 List of Cyperus species

References

subcastaneus
Taxa named by Georg Kükenthal
Plants described in 1929
Flora of Haiti
Flora without expected TNC conservation status